Simone Callender (born 11 November 1978) is a British judoka.

Judo career
Callender, who attended Raine's Foundation School in Bethnal Green is a times seven times champion of Great Britain, winning the heavyweight division at the British Judo Championships in 1996, 1997, 1998, 2000, 2001, 2003 and 2006.

In 2002, she represented England at the 2002 Commonwealth Games and won a gold medal in the over 78kg event.

Achievements

References

1978 births
Living people
English female judoka
Commonwealth Games gold medallists for England
Judoka at the 2002 Commonwealth Games
People educated at Raine's Foundation School
Commonwealth Games medallists in judo
Medallists at the 2002 Commonwealth Games